Morris Arnold may refer to:
Morris F. Arnold (died 1992), American Episcopal suffragan bishop in Massachusetts
Morris S. Arnold (born 1941), retired American appeals court judge

See also
Maurice Arnold (1865–1937), composer